New Richmond is a census-designated place (CDP) in Wyoming County, West Virginia, United States. As of the 2010 census, its population was 238. The community is the site of Wyoming East High School.

References

Census-designated places in West Virginia
Census-designated places in Wyoming County, West Virginia
Populated places on the Guyandotte River